@sohoplace is a West End theatre operated by Nimax Theatres. It is on the site of the previous London Astoria, as part of development around the Elizabeth line's Tottenham Court Road station. It is the first purpose-built West End theatre to be opened in 50 years. It opened on 15 October 2022, with a production of the play Marvellous.

History
@sohoplace was built as part of the Crossrail project to redevelop St Giles Circus. This included the demolition of the London Astoria in 2009. Following the opening of the Elizabeth line in May 2022, it was announced that Nimax Theatres would open the new 602-seat theatre in late 2022. The overall development was designed by architects AHMM, whilst Haworth Tompkins designed the auditorium. Derwent London were the developer and Laing O’Rourke constructed the theatre.

Building

In addition to the 602-seat auditorium, the theatre includes a rehearsal room, actors' green room, bar, restaurant and a terrace. There is also a large digital front-of-house screen on Charing Cross Road.

References

2022 establishments in England

 Theatres completed in 2022

 Theatres in the City of Westminster
 West End theatres